Zhu Shangbing (朱尚炳; 25 November 1380 – 21 April 1412), the Prince of Qin (秦王), was a Chinese prince of the Ming dynasty. He was the son of Zhu Shuang, Prince Min of Qin and the grandson of the Hongwu Emperor.

Family 
Consorts and Issue:

 Primary consort, of the Liu clan (正妃 劉氏), Shaanxi Military Commissioner Liu Sui's (陝西都指揮使 劉遂) daughter
 Zhu Zhigeng, Prince Xi of Qin (秦僖王 朱志堩; 1404–1424), second son
 Concubine, of the Tang clan (側室 唐夫人)
 Zhu Zhijun, Prince Huai of Qin (秦懷王 朱志均; 1403–1426), first son
 Zhu Zhiqie, Prince Kang of Qin (秦康王 朱志𡐤; 1404–1455), third son
 Unknown 
 Zhu Zhibao, Prince Zhuangjing of Yichuan (宜川莊靖王 朱志堢; 1410 – 18 September 1448), fourth son
 Princess Luonan (洛南郡主), first daughter
 Princess Hancheng (韓城郡主), second son
 Princess Huayin (華陰郡主), third daughter

References 

1380 births
1412 deaths
Ming dynasty imperial princes